Holcomb Glacier is a glacier which drains northward to the coast of Marie Byrd Land, Antarctica,  southeast of Groves Island. It was mapped by the United States Geological Survey from surveys and U.S. Navy aerial photographs, 1959–65, and was named by the Advisory Committee on Antarctic Names for Leroy G. Holcomb, an ionospheric physicist who worked at Byrd Station in 1971.

References

Glaciers of Marie Byrd Land